Richard Chambers may refer to:

Richard Chambers (journalist), Irish journalist
Richard Chambers (MP) for Winchelsea (UK Parliament constituency)
Richard Chambers (rower), British rower
Richard Harvey Chambers, United States federal judge
Richard Dickinson Chambers, British chemist
Rome Chambers (Richard Jerome Chambers), Major League Baseball pitcher
Ricky Chambers, character in Ruby in Paradise